Visa requirements for Bruneian citizens are administrative entry restrictions by the authorities of other states which are imposed on citizens of Brunei. As of 28 September 2019, Bruneian citizens had visa-free or visa on arrival access to 165 countries and territories, ranking the Bruneian passport 21st in terms of travel freedom according to the Henley & Partners Passport Index.

Brunei is the only country whose citizens may travel without a visa to all of the permanent member countries of the UN Security Council (China, France, Russia, United Kingdom and  United States). Brunei is also a part of ASEAN and has visa-free access to these countries and vice versa.

Besides the Bruneian passport, there are only 3 other passports that provide either visa-free entry, or entry via an electronic travel authorisation, to the world's four largest economies: China (visa-free, 15 days), India (e-Visa, 60 days), the European Union (visa-free, 90 days within 180 days), and the United States (ESTA required for arrivals by air and sea, 90 days): those of Japan, San Marino, and Singapore.

As of November 2021, Brunei, Grenada, Mauritius and the Seychelles are the only countries whose citizens may travel without a visa to China, Russia, Schengen Area and the United Kingdom.

Visa requirements map

Visa requirements

Territories and disputed areas
Visa requirements for Bruneian citizens for visits to various territories, disputed areas, partially recognized countries and restricted zones:

APEC Business Travel Card

Holders of an APEC Business Travel Card (ABTC)  travelling on business do not require a visa to the following countries:

1 – up to 90 days
2 – up to 60 days
3 – up to 59 days

The card must be used in conjunction with a passport and has the following advantages:
undertake legitimate business in participating economies
expedited border crossing in all member economies, including transitional members
expedited scheduling of visa interview (United States)

Non-visa restrictions

See also

 Visa policy of Brunei
 Bruneian passport

References and Notes
References

Notes

Brunei
Foreign relations of Brunei